The men's Indian clubs event was part of the gymnastics programme at the 1932 Summer Olympics at Los Angeles. It was contested for the only time at the Olympics. The 1904 Summer Olympics saw a club swinging event. The competition was held on Tuesday, August 9, 1932. Four gymnasts from two nations competed.

Medalists

Results

See also 
 Gymnastics at the 1904 Summer Olympics – Men's club swinging
 Indian club

References

External links
 Olympic Report
 

Indian clubs